Ahmad Ismail Ali (14 October 1917 – 26 December 1974) was the Commander-in-Chief of Egypt's army and minister of war during the October War of 1973, and is best known for his planning of the attack across the Suez Canal, code-named Operation Badr. Ali's mother was of partial Albanian descent.

He graduated from the Military Academy in 1938 and was a colleague of both the late President Anwar Sadat and  President Gamal Abdel Nasser in the Academy. After graduating with the rank of second lieutenant, he joined the infantry and served the Second World War and fought in the 1948 Palestine War, the 1956 Tripartite Aggression and the 1967 war. He became in 1969 the Chief of Staff The Egyptian army and then was dismissed by President Abdel Nasser because of the famous Zafarana incident. Then President Sadat returned him to the service as head of the General Intelligence, then he was promoted to the rank of Lieutenant-General and became Minister of War in 1972. He fought the October War and died in 1974.

Military career 
 Graduated from Egypt's Royal Military Academy in 1938.
 Commissioned in an Infantry regiment.
 Served with the Allies in the Western Desert against the Axis during the Second World War
 Fought as an infantry battalion commander in the 1948 Arab-Israeli War.
 Later received training in Great Britain
 Saw active service during the 1956 Suez Crisis, and undertook further training in the Soviet Union
 Served as a division commander during the 1967 Six-Day War of 1967
 Head, Military Operations Authority
 Appointed Chief of the General Staff in March 1969, but was dismissed by President Nasser in September 1969 following successful Israeli raids during the War of Attrition. Nasser's successor as President, Anwar Al-Sadat, however, named him chief of intelligence in September 1970.
 From 1971 to 1972 he served as head of the Egyptian General Intelligence Directorate.

He graduated in 1938 with the rank of second lieutenant and joined the infantry. Then he went on the training mission to Deir Safir in Palestine in 1945, and he ranked first among the Egyptian and English officers. His talent began to shine in the Second World War, in which he participated as an intelligence officer in the Western Sahara. In the Palestine war, he became the commander of an infantry company in Rafah and Gaza, and that experience qualified him to be the first to establish the nucleus of the Sa’ika Forces. He was at the rank of (Colonel) and commanded the 3rd Infantry Brigade in Rafah and then Qantara Sharq during the tripartite aggression carried out by Britain, France and Israel against Egypt in the fall of 1956.

In 1957, he went to military academy in the Soviet Union, and in the same year he worked as a senior teacher at the Military academy in Egypt, after which he left it and took command of the 2nd Infantry Division, which he reconstituted to be the first combatant formation in the Egyptian Armed Forces. In 1960, the old centers of power tried to overthrow him, and he was at the rank of (brigadier) and after 1967, those centers found a justification to overthrow him, and indeed they succeeded in that, but President (Gamal Abdel Nasser) summoned him and handed him the command of the forces east of the Suez Canal, and only three months after The 1967 battles he established the first defensive line and reorganized, trained and armed these forces, and after a short period these forces were able to fight the battle of Ras al-Esh, the Battle of Green Island, and the sinking of the Israeli destroyer (Eilat).

In October 1972, Ali accompanied Prime Minister Aziz Sidqi on a visit to Moscow, and, on his return, stifled a coup attempt against President Sadat. That same month, he replaced the anti-Soviet general Mohammed Ahmed Sadek as Minister of Defence, and was promoted to full general. His skill as a strategist, and his success in reviving the morale of the Egyptian army became evident in the October War of 1973. Following the war, he was made a Field Marshal in November 1973.

Death 
Ali died in December 1974 from advanced cancer in London, at the age of just 57.

Cultural depictions

Television
 Ahmed Ismail Ali was portrayed by Egyptian actor Salah Zulfikar in the 1993 television series The Fox (Al-Tha'lab) which aired on Egyptian television in Egypt and the Arab world.

References

External links
 Defencejournal.com Article
 Britannica.com Article

1917 births
1974 deaths
Military personnel from Cairo
Field marshals of Egypt
Defence Ministers of Egypt
Egyptian people of the Yom Kippur War
20th-century Egyptian military personnel
Egyptian Military Academy alumni
Egyptian people of World War II
Directors of the General Intelligence Directorate (Egypt)
Deaths from cancer in England
Chiefs of the General Staff (Egypt)
20th-century Egyptian politicians